Nummer 2 for thirteen instruments (also called Opus 2 for thirteen instruments) is a composition written in 1951 by the Belgian composer Karel Goeyvaerts.

Nummer 2 has been claimed as the first "total serial" composition. though the same claim has been made for Milton Babbitt's Three Compositions for Piano (1947), which predates Goeyvaerts's work by four years.

Form
Nr 2 is in a single movement, but falls into three large sections. Unlike its immediate predecessor in Goeyvaerts's catalog, Nr 1 (1950–51) Sonata for Two Pianos, and two of its serial successors, the electronic Nr 4 met dode tonen (1952) and Nr 5 met zuivere tonen (1953), Nr 2 uses a recurring twelve-tone row (B F F E G A E D A B D C). In the outer sections this row is played monodically by the piano, five times in succession in part one, and five more times in the third section, but in retrograde. Around this linear presentation, in a second layer, the other twelve instruments present the chromatic total several times in a dispersed order with constant permutation. The middle section works in a contrasting manner, presenting pitches in successive groups of either two or three simultaneously sounding instruments, completing the twelve-tone aggregate every eight bars. Pitch repetitions are initially dispersed, but toward the centre become increasingly more concentrated.

Instrumentation
Nr 2 is scored for flute (doubling piccolo), two oboes, two bass clarinets, piano, two violins, two violas, two cellos, and double bass.

Discography
Goeyvaerts, Karel. The Serial Works [#1–7]. Champ d'Action; Celso Antunes, cond. (in Nr. 2, 3, and 6). Megadisc MDC 7845. Gent: Megadisc Classics, 1998.

Sources

Sources

Further reading
 
 . 1972. "Das Musikdenken von Karel Goeyvaerts in Bezug auf das Schaffen von Karlheinz Stockhausen: Ein Beitrag zur Geschichte der frühseriellen und elektronischen Musik 1950–1956". Interface 2:101–113.
 Sabbe, Herman. 1981. "Die Einheit der Stockhausen-Zeit ...: Neue Erkenntnismöglichkeiten der seriellen Entwicklung anhand des frühen Wirkens von Stockhausen und Goeyvaerts. Dargestellt aufgrund der Briefe Stockhausens an Goevaerts". In Musik-Konzepte 19: Karlheinz Stockhausen: ... wie die Zeit verging ..., edited by Heinz-Klaus Metzger and Rainer Riehn, 5–96. Munich: Edition Text + Kritik.

Serial compositions
Compositions by Karel Goeyvaerts